The Abu Tartur mine is a large proposed mine located in New Valley Governorate. Abu Tartur represents one of the largest phosphates reserve in Egypt having estimated reserves of 980 million tonnes of ore grading 30% P2O5.

As of 2019, the Egyptian minister Tarek El-Molla signed agreements with China State Construction Engineering and the Guizhou state-owned phosphate producer the Wengfu Group to develop the mine.

References 

Phosphate mines in Egypt